Abdul Karim Daoud (born 19 August 1970) is a Yemeni former track and field athlete, who competed in long-distance running. He represented North Yemen at the 1988 Summer Olympic Games in the men's 10,000 metres and finished 21st in his heat, failing to advance.

References

External links
 

1970 births
Living people
Athletes (track and field) at the 1988 Summer Olympics
Olympic athletes of North Yemen
Yemeni male long-distance runners